"On a Roll" is a song recorded by American singer Miley Cyrus under the moniker "Ashley O" (her character in the Black Mirror episode "Rachel, Jack and Ashley Too"). It is an adaptation of the 1989 Nine Inch Nails song "Head Like a Hole". The episode was originally released on June 5, 2019, and the song was later distributed as a standalone single by RCA Records and The Null Corporation on June 14, 2019. The B-side, "Right Where I Belong", is based on the 2005 Nine Inch Nails song "Right Where It Belongs". Nine Inch Nails frontman Trent Reznor approved of the adaptations, and released Black Mirror-themed merchandise to coincide with the episode's release. The song was ranked 28th on the 100 Best Songs of 2019 list by Billboard. The song was not released to radio in the US.

Background and composition
The track interpolates elements of "Head Like a Hole", the 1989 single by American industrial rock band Nine Inch Nails, from their debut studio album Pretty Hate Machine. Therefore, "On a Roll" credits Nine Inch Nails frontman Trent Reznor as a songwriter, and was produced by production trio the Invisible Men. Black Mirror creator Charlie Brooker gained permission from Reznor to use the song, and later re-wrote the lyrics to be "uber-positive" in order to serve as a juxtaposition with the "dark concepts" of the episode. The song is written in the key of B-flat Major in common time with a tempo of 122 beats per minute. BuzzFeed noted online observations that the song's chorus, "Hey yeah woah-ho", sounds like "Hey I'm a hoe", and described it as an example of a mondegreen.

Critical reception
In a positive review, Rolling Stones Brittany Spanos stated: "The underlying darkness and the disconnect of knowing that a cutesy, capitalistic take on a Nine Inch Nails classic shouldn't work but inexplicably does feels like more danger than [Cyrus]'s been able to extract before." Andrew Unterberger of Billboard assumed that the song would become a bigger hit than Cyrus' previous single "Mother's Daughter" and compared Ashley O to Cyrus early in her career, writing: "It's Miley Cyrus freed from narrative. Sure, it probably helps your enjoyment of 'Rachel, Jack and Ashley Too' to consider how Cyrus' own early career was shaped by handlers who didn't necessarily have her own artistic vision or general best interests in mind, and how she ultimately felt the need to break out from that. But the song? It's just A Bop, one that requires no knowledge of Pretty Hate Machine to appreciate its straightforward catchiness and motivational — if more than a little absurd — lyrics."

Music video
The official music video for "On a Roll" was released on June 13, 2019, on Netflix's official YouTube channel.

Andrew Unterberger of Billboard described the video as "[splitting] the difference between 'Bad Romance'-era Gaga and 'California Gurls'-era Katy Perry in a way that would've certainly made it a YouTube smash."

Live performances
Cyrus performed "On a Roll" and "Head Like a Hole" live on June 30, 2019, during her set at Glastonbury Festival 2019 in Pilton, Somerset.

Track listing

Credits and personnel
Credits adapted from Tidal.

 Miley Cyrus – vocals, songwriting
Charlie Brooker – songwriting
Trent Reznor – songwriting
 Chiara Hunter – backing vocals
 The Invisible Men – production, mixing engineers
 Dylan Cooper – keyboards, programming
 George Astasio – keyboards, programming
 Jason Pebworth – keyboards, programming
 Jon Shave - keyboards, programming, recording engineering
 Murray C. Anderson – recording engineering
 Jethro Harris – assistant engineering

Charts

References

Black Mirror
2019 singles
2019 songs
Miley Cyrus songs
RCA Records singles
The Null Corporation singles
Songs from television series
Songs written by Trent Reznor
Song recordings produced by the Invisible Men
Songs written by Miley Cyrus
Nine Inch Nails